The Elizabeth Mine was a copper mine located on the town line between the Town of Strafford and the Town of Thetford, in Orange County, Vermont. 

The ore deposit was discovered in 1793, but mining did not start until 1809. Open pit mining and from 1886 underground mining was conducted.

Due to acid mine drainage the west branch of the Ompompanoosuc River was polluted. Since 2000 the Environmental Protection Agency (EPA) and the Vermont Agency of Natural Resources have been developing a plan to clean up the area.

Geology
The ore deposits at the Elizabeth Mine represent classic examples of sedimentary exhalative type deposition where hydrothermal fluids enter the marine environment and precipitate out minerals in a strataform ore body. The ores are hosted in the strongly deformed Lower Devonian Gile Mountain Formation (a grey to dark grey mica schist). The ore body at the Elizabeth Mine is a massive sulfide deposit consisting primarily of pyrrhotite and chalcopyrite.

See also
Copper mining in the United States
List of Superfund sites in Vermont

References

External links
South Strafford’s Elizabeth Copper Mine: The Tyson Years, 1880–1902  
Vermont Mining
The Geology of the Elizabeth Mine, Peter Howard, 1969
Geologic Map of the Elizabeth Mine Area (Stratford, VT)

Geology of Vermont
Copper mines in the United States
Historic American Engineering Record in Vermont
Superfund sites in Vermont
Mining in Vermont
Orange County, Vermont